This is a list of cricketers who have played for Bedfordshire County Cricket Club in List A matches. Bedfordshire, one of the Minor Counties, played 27 List A cricket matches – a one-day, limited overs form of cricket – between 1967 and 2005. After making their List A debut in the 1967 Gillette Cup the county played six matches in the competition up to 1973 and then once in 1977. Minor counties were not a regular feature of List A competitions and Bedfordshire played ten matches in the NatWest Trophy between 1982 and 2000 before playing ten matches in the Cheltenham & Gloucester Trophy between 2001 and 2005.

The knock-out nature of the Gillette Cup means that in most competitions Bedfordshire only played one match, most often against a first-class county. They won eight matches during the time they competed in List A competitions: the first win coming in their second match in 1968. On three occasions the county reached the third round of a List A competition in 1999, 2001 and 2003, beating other Minor Counties or Cricket Boards, as well as the Netherlands in 2002.

Players are listed alphabetically with the number of matches played and the calendar years in which they made their first and last appearances in List A cricket for Bedfordshire. Most players also made appearances for Bedfordshire in the Minor Counties Championship and some will have represented other sides in top-class cricket. Only their appearances for Bedfordshire are included below.

A

B

C

D

F

G

H

I

J

K

L

M

P

R

S

T

W

Y

Notes

References

Bedfordshire County Cricket Club
Bedfordshire List A
 
Cricketers